Hans Steger may refer to:
 Hans Steger (sculptor), German sculptor
 Hans Ulrich Steger, Swiss caricaturist, children's author and artist